Élie, 1st Duke of Decazes and Glücksbierg (born Élie Louis Decazes; 28 September 178024 October 1860) was a French statesman, leader of the liberal Doctrinaires party during the Bourbon Restoration.

Early life and family

Élie Decazes was born at Saint-Martin-de-Laye, Gironde, son of Michel Decazes (1747–1832) by his wife, whom he married in 1779, Cathérine Trigant de Beaumont. He studied law, became a judge of the Seine Tribunal in 1806, was appointed to the Cabinet of Louis Bonaparte in 1807, and later counsel to the Court of Appeal at Paris in 1811.

On 1 August 1805, in Paris, Decazes married Elisabeth-Fortunée, second daughter of Count Honoré Muraire. She died in Paris on 24 January 1806 without issue.

Decazes married secondly on 11 August 1818 Wilhelmine-Egidia-Octavie de Beaupoil, comtesse de St-Aulaire-Glücksbierg, who died at Versailles on 8 August 1873. By her, he had Louis-Charles-Élie-Amanien (1819–86), the 2nd Duke and later French Foreign Minister, Frédéric-Xavier-Stanislas Decazes (1823Paris, 26 February 1887), an author who died unmarried without issue, and Henriette-Guillermine-Eugénie Decazes de Glücksbierg (23 November 1824Tournai, November, 1899), who married on 19 April 1845 a Belgian, Léopold-Jacques-Alphonse, Baron Lefebvre.

His younger brother Joseph Decazes (1783–1868), created 1st vicomte Decazes, married in 1816 Diane de Bancalis de Maurel d'Aragon, leaving issue: Sophie Decazes (1817–1904), married in 1835 to François de Carbonnel de Canisy; and Élie Decazes (1822–1851), married in 1850 to Elisabeth de Mauvise de Villars, parents of Raymond Decazes (1851–1913), married in 1887 to Marie-Louise Koechlin (having seven children).

A great-granddaughter, Marguerite-Séverine-Philippine Decazes (widow of Prince Jean-Pierre de Broglie), married as her second husband Captain The Hon. Reginald Fellowes JP (1884-1953), son of Lord de Ramsey.

The 6th and present duke, Louis-Frédéric Decazes, born in 1946, is a wine producer and Chevalier du Tastevin.

Royalist
Immediately after the fall of the Empire, Decazes declared himself a Royalist, and remained faithful to the Bourbons throughout the Hundred Days. He met King Louis XVIII during that period, through Baron Louis, and Louis XVIII rewarded his loyalty by appointing him as Prefect of Police for Paris on 9 July 1815. His marked success in that difficult position earned him appointment as Minister of Police, succeeding Fouché, on 24 September.

Meanwhile, he had been elected Deputy for the Seine (August 1815), and both as Deputy and as a Minister he was a key player among moderate Royalists. His plan was "to royalize France and to nationalize the monarchy." The Moderates were a minority in the Chamber of 1815, so Decazes persuaded Louis XVIII to dissolve Parliament, and accordingly the elections of October 1816 returned them with a majority. During the next four years, Decazes was called upon to play a leading role in the French government.

Decazes was Minister of the Interior from 18 December 1818 to 20 February 1820.
The government decided to revive the Exposition des produits de l'industrie française of French industry.
A royal ordinance of 13 January 1819 decreed a series of expositions at intervals of no more than four years, with the first to be held in 1819 and the second in 1821.
Decazes sent directives to all the prefects in France giving the general conditions for products that would be acceptable for the exposition.

Minister of Police
As Minister of Police, he was required to suppress the insurrections provoked by the Ultra-royalists (the White Terror); after the resignation of the 5th Duc de Richelieu, he took over the day-to-day running of the ministry, although General Dessolles remained as nominal head. Decazes simultaneously held the Interior Ministry portfolio. The Cabinet, in which Baron Louis was Finance Minister, and Marshal de Gouvion Saint-Cyr remained Minister of War, was entirely Liberal in composition; and its first move was to abolish the Ministry of Police, as Decazes felt it incompatible with a régime espousing liberty. His reforms met with the strong hostility of the Chamber of Peers, where the ultra-Royalists held a majority, and to overcome their numerical advantage, he persuaded the King to create sixty new Liberal peers.

Decazes then pushed through legislation about the press, repealing censorship laws. By reorganizing the nation's finances, the protection of industry and the carrying out of great public works, France regained economic prosperity, and the government increased in popularity. But the powers of the Grand Alliance had been watching the growth of Liberalism in France with increasing anxiety. In particular, Metternich ascribed this mainly to the "weakness" of the Government, and the political election results of 1819 further illustrated this trend, notably by the election of the famous Abbé Henri Grégoire. A debate started over whether the time had not come to put in force the terms of the secret Congress of Aix-la-Chapelle. It was this threat of foreign intervention, rather than the clamour of the "Ultras," which forced Louis XVIII to urge a change in electoral law to prevent such a "scandal" as Grégoire's election in the future.

Prime Minister

General Dessolles and Baron Louis, refusing to embark on this policy, then resigned; thus Decazes became the new head of government, as president of the council (November 1819). The exclusion of Grégoire from the chamber and the changes in the franchise embittered the radicals also without reconciling the "Ultras." The news of the revolution in Spain in January 1820 compounded matters, as the royal favourite was accused by his opponents to have begun another revolution; and when, on 13 February, Charles Ferdinand, Duke of Berry, the only member of the royal family expected to ensure royal succession, was assassinated; he was accused of being an accomplice in the crime. Decazes, foreseeing the storm, at once offered his resignation to the King. Louis at first refused. "They will attack", he proclaimed, "not your system, my dear son, but mine"; but in the end, he was forced to yield to the importunity of his family (17 February). Decazes, raised to the rank of duke, passed into honourable exile, being posted as Ambassador to Britain.

This ended Decazes' ministerial career. In December 1821, he returned to sit in the House of Peers, where he continued to voice his Liberal opinions. After 1830, he adhered to the July Monarchy, but after 1848, he remained firmly in retirement.

In 1826, Decazes formed an association to represent the coal and iron industries in Aveyron. The name of Decazeville was given to the industry's regional centre in 1829.

Honours
 Duke of Decazes (French title), 1820
 Duke of Glücksbierg (Danish title), 1818
 Chevalier, Ordre du Saint-Esprit
 Grand-croix, Légion d'honneur
 Knight, Order of the Elephant

See also
 Duke of Decazes
 List of Ambassadors of France to the United Kingdom

References

Attribution:

1780 births
1860 deaths
People from Gironde
19th-century French judges
People of the Bourbon Restoration
101
101
Counts of Decazes
Prime Ministers of France
Prefects of police of Paris
Ambassadors of France to the United Kingdom
French interior ministers
Peers of France
19th-century French diplomats
Nobility of the First French Empire
Grand Croix of the Légion d'honneur
Dukes of Denmark